Snigdha is mainly an Indian name originating in the Indian Subcontinent used when admiring or complimenting something. It may be used as an adjective (meaning "elegant", "graceful", "kind", "affectionate", "calm" or "charming"). It means soft and tender.

People with the name
People with the name Snigdha include:

Snigdha (actress), an Indian singer and actress
Snigdha Akolkar, an Indian actress and model
Snigdha Pandey, an Indian actress
Snigdha Nandipati, 2012 Scripps National Spelling Bee champion